Darrell Antwonne Arthur (born March 25, 1988) is an American former professional basketball player. He played college basketball for the Kansas Jayhawks for two seasons where he was part of the 2007–08 national championship team. He was drafted by the New Orleans Hornets in the 2008 NBA draft but after two trades, he ended up with the Memphis Grizzlies, with whom he signed on July 8, 2008.

Darrell is now a part of the Denver Nuggets Front Office.

Arthur is the first cousin of fellow basketball player Quinton Ross.

High school career
In high school, Arthur guided South Oak Cliff High School to back-to-back Texas 4A state titles in 2005 and 2006 and was the tournament's MVP both years.

Those state titles were later forfeited after it was determined that the school had played an ineligible athlete.

During his senior year, Arthur was named a McDonald's All-American and third-team Parade All-American honors in 2006.

In regards to college recruiting, Arthur was considered a five-star recruit by Rivals.com, and 247Sports.com listed him as the consensus top recruit in Texas and the 13th best recruit in the country. .

College career
Arthur's uniform number in college was 00, making him the first Jayhawk to wear that number since Greg Ostertag. He was named to the Big 12 All-Rookie team his Freshmen year in 2006–07. Arthur was named to the All-Big 12 first team the year Kansas won the  NCAA championship.

Professional career

Memphis Grizzlies (2008–2013)
Arthur was selected by the New Orleans Hornets as the 27th overall pick in the 2008 NBA draft but was promptly traded to the Portland Trail Blazers for cash. The Trail Blazers then traded Arthur to the Houston Rockets for draft rights to 25th overall pick Nicolas Batum. Soon afterwards, the Rockets traded Arthur to the Memphis Grizzlies for draft rights to the 28th overall pick Donté Greene.

On September 3, 2008, Arthur and fellow former Kansas Jayhawks teammate Mario Chalmers were excused from NBA's Rookie Training Camp following a marijuana-related incident. Police responding to their hotel room following a fire alarm at 2:00 a.m. claimed that the room smelled strongly of marijuana but none was found and no charges were filed. Fellow NBA rookie Michael Beasley was also reported to have been in the room at the time, but was not asked to leave camp. Beasley was later fined $50,000 for his involvement in the incident
Arthur later released a statement denying any involvement with marijuana. Arthur was later fined $20,000 by the league for missing the rookie camp, but was not fined or suspended for any drug-related violations.

On June 29, 2012, the Grizzlies extended a qualifying offer to Arthur, making him a restricted free agent.

Denver Nuggets (2013–2018)
On June 27, 2013, Arthur was traded to the Denver Nuggets along with 55th overall draft pick Joffrey Lauvergne in exchange for Kosta Koufos. On June 23, 2014, he exercised his player option for the 2014–15 season.

On August 7, 2015, Arthur re-signed with the Nuggets. On March 31, 2016, he tied a career high with 24 points off the bench in a 101–95 loss to the New Orleans Pelicans.

On July 9, 2016, Arthur again re-signed with the Nuggets.

On July 13, 2018, Arthur was traded, along with Kenneth Faried, a protected 2019 first round draft pick and a 2020 second round draft pick, to the Brooklyn Nets in exchange for Isaiah Whitehead. Seven days later, Arthur was traded to the Phoenix Suns in exchange for Jared Dudley and a 2021 second round draft pick. On October 15, 2018, he was waived by the Suns.

NBA career statistics

Regular season

|-
| align="left" | 
| align="left" | Memphis
| 76 || 64 || 19.3 || .438 || .000 || .667 || 4.6 || .6 || .7 || .7 || 5.6
|-
| align="left" | 
| align="left" | Memphis
| 32 || 1 || 14.3 || .432 || .000 || .567 || 3.4 || .5 || .4 || .4 || 4.5
|-
| align="left" | 
| align="left" | Memphis
| 80 || 9 || 20.1 || .497 || .000 || .813 || 4.3 || .7 || .7 || .8 || 9.1
|-
| align="left" | 
| align="left" | Memphis
| 59 || 3 || 16.4 || .451 || .278 || .717 || 2.9 || .6 || .4 || .6 || 6.1
|-
| align="left" | 
| align="left" | Denver
| 68 || 1 || 17.1 || .395 || .375 || .855 || 3.1 || .9 || .6 || .7 || 5.9
|-
| align="left" | 
| align="left" | Denver
| 58 || 4 || 17.0 || .404 || .236 || .780 || 2.9 || 1.0 || .8 || .4 || 6.6
|-
| align="left" | 
| align="left" | Denver
| 70 || 16 || 21.7 || .452 || .385 || .755 || 4.2 || 1.4 || .8 || .7 || 7.5
|-
| align="left" | 
| align="left" | Denver
| 41 || 7 || 15.6 || .442 || .453 || .864 || 2.7 || 1.0 || .5 || .5 || 6.4
|-
| align="left" | 
| align="left" | Denver
| 19 || 1 || 7.4 || .468 || .348 || .667 || .8 || .5 || .4 || .2 || 2.8
|- class="sortbottom"
| align="center" colspan="2"| Career
| 503 || 106 || 17.8 || .444 || .352 || .765 || 3.5 || .8 || .6 || .6 || 6.5

Playoffs

|-
| align="left" | 2011
| align="left" | Memphis
| 13 || 0 || 15.5 || .459 || 1.000 || .765 || 2.2 || .5 || .5 || .9 || 7.1
|-
| align="left" | 2013
| align="left" | Memphis
| 15 || 0 || 11.7 || .472 || .000 || .889 || 2.5 || .4 || .1 || .3 || 3.9
|- class="sortbottom"
| align="center" colspan="2"| Career
| 28 || 0 || 13.4 || .464 || .333 || .808 || 2.4 || .5 || .3 || .6 || 5.4

See also

2006 boys high school basketball All-Americans

References

External links

ESPN.com Profile
Yahoo.com Profile

1988 births
Living people
African-American basketball players
American men's basketball players
Basketball players from Dallas
Denver Nuggets players
Kansas Jayhawks men's basketball players
McDonald's High School All-Americans
Memphis Grizzlies players
New Orleans Hornets draft picks
Parade High School All-Americans (boys' basketball)
Power forwards (basketball)
Small forwards
21st-century African-American sportspeople
20th-century African-American people